Victor Loturi (born May 21, 2001) is a Canadian professional soccer player who plays as a midfielder for Ross County.

Club career

Early career
Loturi began playing organized soccer at age nine with local club Calgary Northside SC, where he played until 2018. In 2017, he represented Alberta at the 2017 Canada Summer Games. In winter 2018, Loturi joined the Calgary Foothills FC Generation Program.

Cavalry FC
Loturi signed with Canadian Premier League club Cavalry FC on April 17, 2019, he was the club's youngest player that season. He made his debut on May 18 against Pacific FC in a Canadian Championship match. On July 1, 2019, Loturi made his league debut for Cavalry in a 3–1 loss to Pacific FC.

Mount Royal and Calgary Foothills
After departing Cavalry FC, Victor Loturi attended Mount Royal University where his U Sports season was ended due to the COVID-19 pandemic. He had also been expected to play for his former youth club Calgary Foothills in USL League Two until the season was also cancelled due to the pandemic.

Return to Cavalry FC

After attending Mount Royal University for a year, Loturi was drafted by Cavalry FC in the 2021 CPL–U Sports Draft and was ultimately re-signed by the club on a developmental contract on June 18, 2021. Unlike in his first stint, now Loturi was a key player for Cavalry, appearing in all but two of the clubs matches. Cavalry finished in second place in the regular season, but in the playoffs were defeated in semifinals. At the end of the season, Loturi was nominated for Best U-21 Canadian of the Year award, but did not win it.

In January 2022, Cavalry announced that they had re-signed Loturi for the 2022 and 2023 seasons, with an option for 2024. On June 16, 2022 Loturi was named to CPL's Gatorade Team of the Week for Week 10.

Ross County
On June 21, 2022, Cavalry FC announced that Loturi had been transferred to Scottish Premiership side Ross County on a six-figure transfer fee, with Cavalry retaining a sell-on clause. On July 16 he made his debut for Ross County, coming on as a substitute for Yan Dhanda in a Scottish League Cup match against Dunfermline Athletic. Loturi scored his first goal for the Staggies on July 23, netting the opener in a 7-0 thrashing of East Fife in the Scottish League Cup.

International career
Loturi is eligible for Canada through his birth in Calgary and South Sudan through his parents. Initially named to South Sudan's provisional squad for 2023 AFCON qualification matches in March 2023, that same week Loturi accepted a  call-up to Canada's squad for CONCACAF Nations League matches against Curaçao and Honduras.

Personal life
Born in Canada, Loturi is of South Sudanese descent. His brother William Akio is also a professional soccer player who plays with him at Ross County. Akio also represents the South Sudan national team.

Career statistics

Honours
Cavalry FC 
 Canadian Premier League Finals 
Runners-up: 2019
Canadian Premier League (Regular season): 
Champions: Spring 2019, Fall 2019

References

External links

2001 births
Living people
Canadian soccer players
Canadian people of South Sudanese descent
Canadian sportspeople of African descent
Sportspeople of South Sudanese descent
Black Canadian soccer players
Soccer players from Calgary
Calgary Foothills FC players
Cavalry FC draft picks
Cavalry FC players
Canadian Premier League players
Association football midfielders
Mount Royal University alumni
University and college soccer players in Canada
Scottish Professional Football League players
Ross County F.C. players
Canadian expatriate soccer players
Canadian expatriate sportspeople in Scotland
Expatriate footballers in Scotland